Uruguayans in Sweden are people born in Uruguay who live in Sweden, or Swedish-born people of Uruguayan descent. As of 2013, there were over 4,000 Uruguayans living in Swedish territory.

Overview
Since Sweden was and remains a highly democratic country and a net receiver of immigrants, during the civic-military dictatorship of Uruguay (1973–1985) there were several Uruguayans fled to Sweden; this was possible, among others, much because of Ambassador Harald Edelstam.  Nowadays there are many Uruguayans who still live in Sweden. 

Uruguayan residents in Sweden have their own institutions, for instance, Casa Uruguay in Malmö and the Consultative Councils in Stockholm and Gothenburg.

Notable people 
past
 Dahd Sfeir (1932–2015), actress
present
 Hebert Abimorad (born 1946 in Montevideo), poet, translator and journalist
 Henry Engler (born 1946 in Paysandú), neuroscientist, former Tupamaro
 Roberto Mascaró (born 1948 in Montevideo), poet and translator
 Ana Luisa Valdés (born 1953 in Montevideo), anthropologist and translator
 Martin Lopez (born 1978 in Stockholm), drummer
 Martin Mendez (born 1978 in Montevideo), bass guitar player 
 Guillermo Molins (born 1988 in Montevideo), footballer
 Sofía Rito (born 1985 in Stockholm), weightlifter
 Sebastian Senatore (born 1985 in Montevideo), footballer

See also
Sweden–Uruguay relations
Emigration from Uruguay

References

Ethnic groups in Sweden
 
 
Sweden